Timeri Murari is an Indian novelist, journalist, playwright and screenwriter. He is the author of fourteen published novels, including best-sellers The Taliban Cricket Club (2012) and Taj (2007), and has written extensively for Indian and international newspapers including The Guardian. He has also written the screenplay of the award-winning Hindi movie Daayraa (1997), which was voted one of the ten best films of 1997 by Time magazine.
 He adapted and directed it as a stage play, The Square Circle, at the Leicester Haymarket Theatre in November 1999, starring Parminder Nagra. His latest novel is called Chanakya Returns.

Early years
Murari was born in Madras, India and studied at Bishop Cottons School, Bangalore. He left India for the UK when he was 18 years old to study electronic engineering. He later switched majors to History and Political Science at the McGill University, Montreal. While at university, he began writing for The Guardian and other international newspapers.

His first job was a reporter on the Kingston Whig Standard, in Kingston, Ontario.
 Murari moved to London, UK, and worked and wrote for The Guardian, The Sunday Times, The Observer and other newspapers and magazines before once again shifting base to New York. In the US, Murari wrote film documentaries and contributed to The New York Times, The Washington Post, Cosmopolitan among others. He is now living in India.

Novels
Murari's first novel, The Marriage, was published in the UK and India. Since then, he has written 18 books, which have been translated into several languages. Fourteen are works of fiction, including the best sellers Taj, which has been translated into 25 languages, and The Taliban Cricket Club, translated into nine languages. Two of his novels - Field of Honour(I was very much impressed with Field of Honour- Graham Greene) and Four Steps from Paradise - are semi-biographical. He has also written a book for children, Children of the Enchanted Jungle. Scholastic published his Young Adult Axxiss Trilogy in 2016 through to 2018. Aleph has published his latest novel, Chanakya Returns (Indian title) in July 2014. In 2019, the UK publisher, Endeavour Media re-issued his novels, TAJ, The Imperial Agent and The Last Victory online as well as print-on-demand. Also in 2019, Speaking Tiger published his travel/history/memoire, Empress of the Taj, In search of Mumtaz Mahal.

Non-fiction
Murari has written five non-fiction books. Two of these are memoirs -- My Temporary Son and Limping to the Centre of the World. Empress of the Taj, In search of Mumtaz Mahal is also partly a travel memoire.

Bibliography

Novels
 The Marriage
 The Oblivion Tapes
 Lovers Are Not People
 The Shooter
 Field of Honour
 TAJ, A Novel on Mughal India
 Imperial Agent, a sequel to Kipling's Kim
 The Last Victory Part II of Imperial Age
 Enduring Affairs
 Four Steps From Paradise
 The Arrangements of Love
 The Small House
 The Taliban Cricket Club
 Chanakya Returns

Young Adult
1. Children of the Enchanted Jungle.

2. Axxiss Trilogy.
 Axxiss and The Magic Medallions.
  Axxiss and The Undersea Kingdom.
  Axxiss and the Parallel Universe.

Non-fiction
 Empress of the Taj, In search of Mumtaz Mahal.
 My Temporary Son: An Orphan's Journey
 Limping to the Centre of the World: A Pilgrimage to Mount Kailash
 Goin’ Home, a Black Family Returns South
 The New Savages: Children of the Liverpool Streets

Plays
 Enter Queen Lear, starring Jenny Runacre staged in London September 2016. Jenny said: "I do really think it is a fascinating play, with so many levels in it.  It is not very often that an actress is given a role that has so much meat in it."
 Square Circle Starring Parminder Nagra. (Also directed)
 Killing Time
 The Attempted Assassination of Salman Rushdie
 Lovers Are Not People
 The Inquisitor
 Hey, Hero!

Film/Television
 Daayra (The Square Circle) Writer/Producer.
 The Only Thing
 Only in America (A TV documentary in three parts) Writer.

References

External links 
 

Living people
Indian male novelists
Indian male dramatists and playwrights
Writers from Chennai
1941 births